The Constitution of Ukraine is the fundamental law of Ukraine. The constitution was adopted and ratified at the 5th session of the Verkhovna Rada, the parliament of Ukraine, on 28 June 1996. The constitution was passed with 315 ayes out of 450 votes possible (300 ayes minimum). All other laws and other normative legal acts of Ukraine must conform to the constitution. The right to amend the constitution through a special legislative procedure is vested exclusively in the parliament. The only body that may interpret the constitution and determine whether legislation conforms to it is the Constitutional Court of Ukraine. Since 1996, the public holiday Constitution Day is celebrated on 28 June.

In 2004, amendments were adopted that significantly changed Ukraine's political system; these changes are sometimes referred to as the 2004 Constitution. In 2010, then-President of Ukraine Viktor Yanukovych reverted these changes on the basis of a ruling made by the Constitutional Court of Ukraine. Following the events of Euromaidan (2013–2014), the 2004 amendments were reinstated.

History

Until 8 June 1995, Ukraine's supreme law was the Constitution (Fundamental Law) of the Ukrainian SSR (adopted in 1978, with numerous later amendments). On 8 June 1995, President Leonid Kuchma and Speaker Oleksandr Moroz (acting on behalf of the parliament) signed the Constitutional Agreement for the period until a new constitution could be drafted.

The first constitution since independence was adopted during an overnight parliamentary session after almost 24 hours of debate of 27–28 June 1996, unofficially known as "the constitutional night of 1996." The Law No. 254/96-BP ratifying the constitution, nullifying previous constitutions and the Agreement was ceremonially signed and promulgated in mid-July 1996. According to a ruling of the Constitutional Court of Ukraine, the constitution took force at the moment when the results of the parliamentary vote were announced on 28 June 1996 at approx. 9 a.m. Kyiv Time. Ukraine was the last of the post-Soviet states to adopt its own constitution. On Constitution Day 2018, President Petro Poroshenko remarked that the 1710 Constitution of Pylyp Orlyk is the predecessor of Ukraine's current constitution.

In February 2019 the constitution was amended to require governments to seek EU and NATO membership.

Structure
The Constitution of Ukraine is divided into 15 chapters:

 General Principles
 Human and Citizens' Rights, Freedoms and Duties
 Elections. Referendums
Verkhovna Rada of Ukraine
 President of Ukraine
 Cabinet of Ministers of Ukraine. Other Bodies of Executive Power
 Prokuratura (Prosecutor's Office)
 Justice
 Territorial Structure of Ukraine
 Autonomous Republic of Crimea
 Local Self-Government
 Constitutional Court of Ukraine
 Introducing Amendments to the Constitution of Ukraine
 Final Provisions
 Transitional Provisions

Amendments
In accordance with Chapter XIII: Introducing Amendments to the Constitution of Ukraine, the constitution can only be amended with the consent of no less than two-thirds of the constitutional composition (the 450 Ukrainian lawmakers) of the Verkhovna Rada of Ukraine. In addition, amendments to Chapter I — "General Principles," Chapter III — "Elections. Referendum", and Chapter XIII — "Introducing Amendments to the Constitution of Ukraine" can only be amended by the parliament of Ukraine on the condition that it is also approved by an All-Ukrainian referendum designated by the President of Ukraine. In May 2012, President Viktor Yanukovych set up the Constitutional Assembly of Ukraine; a special auxiliary agency under the President for drawing up bills of amendments to the Constitution, the president then will introduce them in parliament.

2004 and 2010 amendments and 2014 return to 2004 amendments

On 8 December 2004, the parliament passed Law No. 2222-IV amending the constitution. The law was approved with a 90 percent majority (402 voted in favour and 21 against, with 19 abstentions; 300 in favour required for passage) simultaneously with other legislative measures aimed at resolving the 2004 presidential election crisis. It was signed almost immediately in the parliamentary chamber by the outgoing President Leonid Kuchma and promulgated on the same day. These amendments weakened the power of the President of Ukraine, who lost the power to nominate the Prime Minister of Ukraine, which became the task of the parliament solely. The President could only appoint the Minister of Defence and Foreign Minister. The President also lost the right to dismiss members of the Cabinet of Ukraine, but gained the right to dissolve Parliament. If no coalition in parliament could be formed to appoint a Prime Minister, the President would have no choice but to call new parliamentary elections. The 2004 constitutional amendments were passed in the Parliament only with limited consultation and discussion between political forces, in the context of the Orange Revolution. They therefore attracted criticism from several internal (Ukrainian political parties) and external bodies (the Council of Europe, the European Parliament and the Venice Commission).

The amendments took force unconditionally on 1 January 2006. The remaining amendments took force on 25 May 2006, when the new parliament assembled after the 2006 elections. On 1 October 2010, the Constitutional Court of Ukraine overturned the 2004 amendments, considering them unconstitutional. The Court had started to consider the case on the political reform in 2004 under a motion from 252 coalition lawmakers regarding the constitutionality of this reform of 14 July 2010. The 2010 nullification decision was highly controversial. The Council of Europe's Human Rights Commissioner received several reports alleging that the resignation of four judges in the run-up to the decision occurred as a result of extensive pressure by the executive. On 18 November 2010, the Venice Commission published its report titled The Opinion of the Constitutional Situation in Ukraine in Review of the Judgement of Ukraine's Constitutional Court, in which it stated: "It also considers highly unusual that far-reaching constitutional amendments, including the change of the political system of the country – from a parliamentary system to a parliamentary presidential one – are declared unconstitutional by a decision of the Constitutional Court after a period of 6 years. ... As Constitutional Courts are bound by the Constitution and do not stand above it, such decisions raise important questions of democratic legitimacy and the rule of law".

On 21 February 2014, the parliament passed a law that reinstated the 8 December 2004 amendments of the constitution. This was passed under simplified procedure without any decision of the relevant committee and was passed in the first and the second reading in one voting by 386 deputies. The law was approved by 140 MPs of the Party of Regions, 89 MPs of Batkivshchyna, 40 MPs of UDAR, 32 of the Communist Party, and 50 independent lawmakers. According to Radio Free Europe, the measure was not signed by the then-President Viktor Yanukovych, who was subsequently removed from office. The reinstitution of amendments was adopted according to the 2014 Agreement on settlement of political crisis in Ukraine. This was followed shortly thereafter by the annexation of Crimea by the Russian Federation and the 2014 Russian military intervention in Ukraine.

2019 amendments
On 7 February 2019, the Verkhovna Rada voted 334 to 17 to amend the constitution to state Ukraine's strategic objectives as joining the European Union and NATO.

See also

Former constitutions 
 Constitution of Pylyp Orlyk (1710)
 Constitution of the Ukrainian National Republic (1917)
 First Constitution of the Ukrainian SSR (1919)
 Amendments of 1925
 Second Constitution of the Ukrainian SSR (1929)
 Third Constitution of the Ukrainian SSR (1937)
 Fourth Constitution of the Ukrainian SSR (1978)
 Constitution of the Autonomous Republic of Crimea (1998)

Others 
 Constitutional economics
 Constitutionalism
 Rule according to higher law

References

Further reading

External links 

 Official text of Constitution — site of the parliament 
 English translation of Constitution (download of a .doc file)
 Amendments (Law No. 2222-IV) — site of the parliament 
 Constitution of 1978 (with amendments) — site of the parliament 
 Constitution of 1978 (original) — site of the parliament 
 Constitutional Agreement of 1995 — site of the parliament 
 Declaration on the State Sovereignty of 16 July 1990 — site of the parliament 
 Independence Act of 24 August 1991 — site of the parliament 
 Constitutional process in Ukraine (including historical legal documents and the chronicles of adoption of the Constitution of 1996) — site of the parliament 
 Venice Commission - Ukraine Council of Europe 

 
Government of Ukraine
Law of Ukraine
1996 in law
1996 in Ukraine
Euromaidan
Ukrainian presidential inaugurations
June 1996 events in Europe